The Nobel Prize is an annual, international prize first awarded in 1901 for achievements in Physics, Chemistry, Physiology or Medicine, Literature, and Peace. An associated prize in Economics has been awarded since 1969. Nobel Prizes have been awarded to over 800 individuals.

Asians have been the recipients of all six award categories: Physics, Chemistry, Physiology or Medicine, Literature, Peace, and Economics. The first Asian recipient, Rabindranath Tagore, was awarded the Literature Prize in 1913. In 1930, C. V. Raman became the first Asian recipient of a Nobel Prize in one of the sciences. The most Nobel Prizes awarded to Asians in a single year was in 2014, when five Asians became laureates. The most recent Asian laureates, Japanese scientist Syukuro Manabe and the Filipino journalist Maria Ressa was awarded their prizes in 2021.

To date (2021), there have been fifty-nine Asian winners of the Nobel Prize, including twenty-nine Japanese, twelve Israeli, nine Indian (not including non-Indian Laureates born in India) and eight Chinese (not including non-Chinese Laureates born in China). The list does not include Russians.

Physics
As of 2021, there are 21 Asians or Asian Americans who have won the Nobel Prize in Physics. Japanese comprise the majority, with 12 laureates.

Chemistry
As of 2019, there are 19 Asians or Asian Americans who won the Nobel Prize in Chemistry, with the Japanese comprising the most with 8 laureates.

Physiology or Medicine
As of 2018, there are 7 Asians who won Nobel Prize in Physiology or Medicine, with the Japanese comprising the most with 5 laureates.

Literature
As of 2018, there are 8 Asians who won Nobel Prize in Literature, with the Japanese comprising the most with 3 laureates.

Peace
As of 2021, there are 21 Asians who won Nobel Prize in Peace, with the Israeli and Indian comprising the most with 3 laureates.

Economics
As of 2019, four Asians have won the Nobel Prize in Economics.

Non-Asian born Laureates of Asian descent

Non-Asian Laureates born in Asia

See also
 List of Filipino Nobel laureates and nominees

References

Lists of Nobel laureates by ethnicity
Nobel